Docker or dockers often refers to:
 Stevedore, a type of waterfront workman also called a longshoreman or dockworker

Docker or dockers may also refer to:

Places
 Docker, Cumbria, a civil parish in England
 Docker, Lancashire, a hamlet in England 
 Docker, Victoria, Australia
 Docker River or Kaltukatjara, a place in Northern Territory, Australia

Brands and enterprises
 Docker (software), an open-source software project automating the deployment of applications inside software containers
 Docker, Inc., the company promoting Docker software
 Dockers (brand), a brand of men's clothing by Levi Strauss & Co.

Sports teams
 Cincinnati Dockers, an American-based Australian rules football team
 Drogheda Dockers, a football team in the Australian Rules Football League of Ireland
 Duisburg Dockers, baseball and American football teams in Duisburg, Germany
 Fremantle Football Club, nicknamed the Dockers, an Australian Football League team
 Hamburg Dockers, a football team in the Australian Football League of Germany
 Millwall F.C., formerly nicknamed the Dockers

Other uses
 Docker (surname), a surname (including a list of people with the name)
 Dockers (film), a British television drama film
 Roller docker, a baking tool used to perforate dough

See also
 Dock (disambiguation)
 Docking (disambiguation)